Kerem Kamal (born 10 August 1999) is a Turkish wrestler competing in the 60 kg division of Greco-Roman wrestling. He is a member of İzmir BB GSK He won the gold medal in the 60 kg event at the 2022 European Wrestling Championships held in Budapest, Hungary.

Career 

In 2018, he won the gold medal in the men's 60 kg event at the European U23 Wrestling Championship held in Istanbul, Turkey. In that same year, he also won one of the bronze medals in that event at the 2018 World U23 Wrestling Championship held in Bucharest, Romania.

In 2020, he won the silver medal in the 60 kg event at the European Wrestling Championships held in Rome, Italy. A year earlier, he won one of the bronze medals in this event.

In March 2021, he qualified at the European Qualification Tournament to compete at the 2020 Summer Olympics in Tokyo, Japan. He competed in the men's 60 kg event where he was eliminated in his first match.

In November 2021, he won one of the bronze medals in that event at the 2021 U23 World Wrestling Championships held in Belgrade, Serbia.

He won the gold medal in the 60 kg event at the 2022 European Wrestling Championships held in Budapest, Hungary. He also won the gold medal in the 60 kg event at the 2022 Mediterranean Games held in Oran, Algeria.

Achievements

References

External links 
 

Living people
Sportspeople from Manisa
Turkish male sport wrestlers
European Games competitors for Turkey
Wrestlers at the 2019 European Games
European Wrestling Championships medalists
Wrestlers at the 2020 Summer Olympics
Olympic wrestlers of Turkey
1999 births
European Wrestling Champions
Competitors at the 2022 Mediterranean Games
Mediterranean Games medalists in wrestling
Mediterranean Games gold medalists for Turkey
21st-century Turkish people